Suru L'ere is a 2016 Nigerian comedy drama film, co-produced and directed by Mildred Okwo. It stars Seun Ajayi, Beverly Naya, Kemi Lala Akindoju, Tope Tedela and Enyinna Nwigwe, with a special appearance from Rita Dominic.

Set in Lagos, the film revolves around Arinze (Seun Ajayi), a young graduate trainee, who is a serial debtor, desperately eager to get ahead.

Cast
Seun Ajayi as Arinze
Beverly Naya as Omosigho
Tope Tedela as Kyle Stevens Adedoyin
Kemi Lala Akindoju as Land Lady
Kenneth Okolie as Bossi
Enyinna Nwigwe as Godstime
Gregory Ojefua as Brume
Bikiya Graham-Douglas as
Rita Dominic as Akara seller (special appearance)

Production

Casting
In March 2015, it was announced that Beverly Naya would be starring in Suru L'ere. Rita Dominic, who is the executive producer of the film had a cameo appearance as a local Akara seller.

Filming
Principal photography of Suru L'ere commenced in April 2015, and was shot in ten days.

Promotions
On 16 April 2015, Behind the scenes photos for Suru L'ere were published on BellaNaija. It was also published on Nigerian Entertainment Today and other major media outlets and entertainment blogs. The first official trailer was released on YouTube on 8 September 2015. A Television trailer was released on 15 January 2016.

Release
The film was released on 12 February 2016.

References

External links

2016 romantic comedy-drama films
Nigerian romantic comedy-drama films
Films shot in Lagos
Films set in Lagos
2016 comedy films
2016 drama films